Johannes Georg Smith Harder, known as Hans Harder (12 August 1792 – 25 November 1873) was a Danish painter and drawing master.  He was known especially as a painter of landscapes.

Biography
Harder was born  in Copenhagen, Denmark. 
He studied at the Royal Danish Academy of Fine Arts.   In 1822, he became a drawing teacher at  the Sorø Academy. With funding from the Fonden ad usus publicos, he  conducted a study trip to  Munich, Italy and Austria during 1825–29.  In 1830, he was unanimously elected as a member of the Art Academy. He remained a drawing teacher at Sorø Academy for most of his life, resigning in 1862. He died during 1873 in Sorø.

References

19th-century Danish painters
Danish male painters
Artists from Copenhagen
Royal Danish Academy of Fine Arts alumni
1792 births
1873 deaths
Landscape artists
19th-century Danish male artists